Galeodea alcocki, common name : Alcock's false tun,  is a species of large sea snail, a marine gastropod mollusk in the family Cassidae, the helmet snails and bonnet snails.

Description
The shell size varies between 50 mm and 115 mm

Distribution
This marine species occurs in the Bay of Bengal and off the Philippines and Papua New Guinea.

References

 Kreipl K. & Alf A. (2002) A new species of Galeodea Link, 1807 (Mollusca: Gastropoda: Cassidae) from the Philippine Islands. Novapex 3(2-3): 83-85
 Beu A.G. (2008) Recent deep-water Cassidae of the world. A revision of Galeodea, Oocorys, Sconsia, Echinophoria and related taxa, with new genera and species (Mollusca, Gastropoda). In Héros V., Cowie R.H. & Bouchet P. (eds), Tropical Deep-Sea Benthos 25. Mémoires du Muséum National d'Histoire Naturelle 196: 269-387.
page(s): 291

External links
 Gastropods.com : Galeodea beui; accessed : 23 February 2011

alcocki
Gastropods described in 1906